Enemy Agents Meet Ellery Queen is a 1942 black-and-white thriller film, directed by James P. Hogan and written by Ellery Queen, the duo of Manfred Lee and Frederic Dannay.

The film was the final entry in the Ellery Queen film series.

Plot

Cast
William Gargan ... Ellery Queen
Margaret Lindsay ... Nikki Porter
Charley Grapewin ... Inspector Richard Queen
Gale Sondergaard ...  Mrs. Van Dorn
Gilbert Roland ... Paul Gillete
Sig Ruman ... Heinrich
James Burke ... Police Sergeant Valle
Ernst Deutsch ... Dr. Morse
Maurice Cass ... Mr. Calkus
Minor Watson ... Commander Lang
Felix Basch ... Helm
James Seay ... Marine Sergeant Stevens
Ludwig Donath ... Reece
Dick Wessel ... The Big Sailor.

Production
The film was original titled Ellery Queen Across the Atlantic, and was produced in May 1942

References

External links

1940s thriller films
Columbia Pictures films
Films directed by James Patrick Hogan
American black-and-white films
American thriller films
World War II films made in wartime
1940s English-language films
Ellery Queen films